Sjösa is a locality situated in Nyköping Municipality, Södermanland County, Sweden with 483 inhabitants in 2010.

Elections 
Sjösa is the sole locality in the otherwise rural Svärta electoral ward that covers the area around Svärta Church a few miles to its northwest.

Riksdag

References 

Populated places in Södermanland County
Populated places in Nyköping Municipality